Dyan Castillejo-Garcia (born September 15, 1965), commonly known by her maiden name, Dyan Castillejo, is a Filipino former tennis player and sports reporter.

Tennis career
Castillejo represented the Philippines in the Fed Cup ties from 1981 to 1990. She also competed in the Asian Games, Southeast Asian Games, Junior Wimbledon and Junior US Open. She was also the first Filipino to earn a WTA women's ranking.

In 2017, Castillejo was conferred the Fed Cup Commitment Award, an award given to players that has played at least 20 World Group ties or 40 ties in any level, by the International Tennis Federation. She was the first Filipino to be given with the distinction.

Post-playing career
Castillejo has worked as a sports interviewer for ABS-CBN Sports, interviewing Manny Pacquiao and his Mexican opponents. She is also host for a number of TV programs such as The World Tonight, Gym Team, The MBA-Beat, TV Patrol, and Sports Unlimited.

Television
Sports Unlimited / Sports U (1997–2020)
Metropolitan Basketball Association (1998)
The MBA Beat (1998)

Personal life
Castillejo is married to Anton Garcia, a businessman since 1999. She has a son, Matthew who also plays competitive tennis. Her son has won the Under-14 national group tournament title in 2016.

References

Tennis match in Spanish

External links

1965 births
Living people
Filipino female tennis players
Filipino radio journalists
Filipino television journalists
Tennis players at the 1982 Asian Games
Tennis players at the 1986 Asian Games
ABS-CBN News and Current Affairs people
Filipino television sportscasters
Southeast Asian Games silver medalists for the Philippines
Southeast Asian Games bronze medalists for the Philippines
Southeast Asian Games medalists in tennis
Women television journalists
Women radio journalists
Competitors at the 1981 Southeast Asian Games
Competitors at the 1983 Southeast Asian Games
Competitors at the 1985 Southeast Asian Games
Competitors at the 1987 Southeast Asian Games
Asian Games competitors for the Philippines